The International Novi Sad Literature Festival (Serbian: Međunarodni književni festival) is a literary festival held annually in the city of Novi Sad, Serbia. It was founded by the Association of Writers of Vojvodina ( Serbian: Društvo književnika Vojvodine) in 2006. It is held еvery year in August and September.

The festival features contemporary poets, novelist and critics, who represent and promote contemporary literature from various countries. The Festival includes readings, performances, exhibitions and music. More than 900 writers from Serbia and abroad participated in the first thirteen festivals. The works of participants of the Festival are published in literary journal Zlatna greda. The winning author of the International Novi Sad Literature festival is awarded by having his or her winning book published in Serbian.

Events
The programme of the Festival includes afternoon and evening readings and discussions in various venues throughout the city (libraries, clubs, cafès, squares), as well as other towns in Serbia. The readings represent national literatures, groups of authors or single authors.

Main events are:
 The evening reading on Trg mladenaca in the city centre, in front of the Poetry Gate
 A symposium which is held each year to discuss important contemporary literary themes
 A poetry slam
 Two awarding ceremonies: 
Branko’s Award Ceremony at Sremski Karlovci
International Literary Award Of Novi Sad Ceremony on Trg mladenaca
 Daily picnics in which participants may take a boat ride on the Danube from Novi Sad to Sremski Karlovci and visit monasteries on Fruska Gora.

Participants on Festival

International participants

Serbian authors

Awards

Branko’s Award

During the Festival, a ceremony of awarding "Branko’s Award" (Serbian: Brankova nagrada) to the Young Serbian poet of the Year is held in Sremski Karlovci.

The most important Branko Award’s Laureates

Vasko Popa
Aleksandar Tišma
Borislav Radović
Rajko Petrov Nogo
Raša Livada
Mile Stojić
Branko Maleš
Nina Živančević
Dragan Jovanović Danilov
Ana Ristović
Radomir D. Mitrić

International Literary Award Novi Sad
Every year, The International Literary Award of Novi Sad is given to a world-renowned living poet for his poetic oeuvre or life achievement in the field of poetry.

Previous laureates include:
 Christoph Meckel 
 Jean Pierre Faye 
 Ben Okri
 Guy Goffette

References

External links
Official site of Association of Writers of Vojvodina

Culture in Novi Sad
Culture of Vojvodina
Literary festivals in Serbia